Mesechites  is a genus of plants in the family Apocynaceae first described as a genus in 1860. It is native to Mexico, Central America, South America, and the West Indies.

Species
 Mesechites acuminatus (Ruiz & Pav.) Müll.Arg. - Peru
 Mesechites angustifolius (Poir.) Miers - Hispaniola
 Mesechites citrifolius (Kunth) Woodson - Colombia
 Mesechites mansoanus (A.DC.) Woodson - Paraguay, Brazil
 Mesechites minimus (Britton & P.Wilson) Woodson - Cuba
 Mesechites repens (Jacq.) Miers - Hispaniola, Navassa Island, Jamaica
 Mesechites roseus (A.DC.) Miers - Cuba
 Mesechites trifidus (Jacq.) Müll.Arg.  - widespread from Tamaulipas in NE Mexico south to Paraguay + N Argentina

formerly included
 Mesechites andrieuxii (Müll.Arg.) Miers = Mandevilla convolvulacea (A.DC.) Hemsl.
 Mesechites angustatus Miers = Mandevilla benthamii (A.DC.) K.Schum. 
 Mesechites brownei (A.DC.) Miers = Mandevilla torosa (Jacq.) Woodson
 Mesechites dichotomus (Kunth) Miers = Laubertia boissieri A.DC. 
 Mesechites guayaquilensis Miers = Mandevilla subsagittata (Ruiz & Pav.) Woodson
 Mesechites guianensis (A.DC.) Miers = Mandevilla rugellosa (Rich.) L.Allorge
 Mesechites hastatus Miers = Mandevilla subsagittata (Ruiz & Pav.) Woodson
 Mesechites hirtellulus Miers = Mandevilla oaxacana (A.DC.) Hemsl.
 Mesechites hirtellus (Kunth) Miers = Mandevilla subsagittata (Ruiz & Pav.) Woodson
 Mesechites jasminiflorus (M.Martens & Galeotti) Miers = Mandevilla subsagittata (Ruiz & Pav.) Woodson
 Mesechites lanceolatus (R.Br.) Miers = Parsonsia lanceolata R.Br.
 Mesechites oaxacanus (A.DC.) Miers = Mandevilla oaxacana (A.DC.) Hemsl.
 Mesechites ovalis (Ruiz & Pav. ex Markgr.) Pichon = Allomarkgrafia ovalis (Ruiz & Pav. ex Markgr.) Woodson
 Mesechites plumeriiflorus (Woodson) Pichon = Allomarkgrafia plumeriiflora Woodson
 Mesechites siphiliticus (L.f.) Lemée = Tabernaemontana siphilitica (L.f.) Leeuwenb.
 Mesechites subcarnosus (Benth.) Miers = Mandevilla subcarnosa (Benth.) Woodson
 Mesechites sulphureus (Vell.) Müll.Arg. = Prestonia coalita (Vell.) Woodson
 Mesechites torulosus (L.) Miers = Mandevilla torosa (Jacq.) Woodson

References

Apocynaceae genera
Mesechiteae